Lordlings of Yore is a 1983 video game published by Softlore Corporation.

Gameplay
Lordlings of Yore is a game in which the player is the lord of a shire who must manage knights and wealth, and eliminate opposing lords in a game involving strategy, tactics, and diplomacy.

Reception
Computer Gaming World reviewed the game and stated that "The graphic presentation of the game is excellent and overall I found the game enjoyable. There are enough alternatives and actions in this game to continue to make it interesting to play over and over again."

In a retrospective review of Lordlings of Yore in Black Gate, John ONeill said "Lordlings of Yore had a lot of promise, but I can only conjecture it was an abysmal failure as a commercial release."

Reviews
 Casus Belli #20 (April 1984)

References

External links
Review in Family Computing
Review in II Alive
Review in Tilt (French)
Review in Hardcore Computist
Entry in The Book of Apple Software

1983 video games
Apple II games
Apple II-only games
Fantasy video games
Turn-based strategy video games
Video games developed in the United States